Free Form is an album by Jamaican saxophonist Joe Harriott recorded in England in 1960 and the second released on the Jazzland label.

Reception

Allmusic awarded the album 4 stars stating "Comparable to Ornette Coleman's recordings of the period, these eight pieces incorporate Harriott's hard bop influence, cutting through adventurous compositions.

Track listing
All compositions by Joe Harriott
 "Formation" - 6:13    
 "Coda" - 8:00    
 "Abstract" - 3:39    
 "Impression" - 5:32    
 "Parallel" - 5:42    
 "Straight Lines" - 5:57    
 "Calypso" - 4:44    
 "Tempo" - 6:23

Personnel 
Joe Harriott - alto saxophone
Shake Keane - trumpet 
Pat Smythe - piano
Coleridge Goode - bass
Phil Seamen - drums

References 

Jazzland Records (1960) albums
Joe Harriott albums
1961 albums